Expert Review of Clinical Pharmacology is a monthly peer-reviewed medical journal covering all aspects of clinical pharmacology published by Taylor & Francis.

Background 
The journal is abstracted and indexed in Chemical Abstracts, EMBASE/Excerpta Medica, MEDLINE/Index Medicus/PubMed, and Scopus. Content focuses on all aspects of clinical pharmacology and accepts both original scholarship as well as reviews. The journal has a rigorous peer-review process. The journal publishes most of the time almost instantly upon acceptance with a normal turnaround time of 72 hours. The current commissioning editor is Jermaine Wilcock.

External links

References 

Pharmacology journals
English-language journals
Expert Review journals
Monthly journals
Publications established in 2003